The British Rail Class 805 AT300 is a type of bi-mode multiple unit which is being built by Hitachi Rail for Avanti West Coast. Based on the Hitachi A-train design, 13 five-car units are being built to replace Class 221s on services between London Euston and stations on the North Wales Coast and Shrewsbury lines. Their introduction will allow the elimination of long-distance diesel working on electrified routes.

History
In December 2019, Avanti West Coast placed an order for 13 five-car bi-mode units which will replace its Class 221 fleet, along with 10 Class 807 electric units as part of £350million contract with Hitachi Rail.  All are scheduled to be in service by 2023.
The trains are financed by Rock Rail West Coast, a joint venture between Rock Rail and Standard Life Aberdeen.
The trains will be maintained by a joint team of Alstom and Hitachi staff, alongside Class 807s, at Oxley depot near Wolverhampton.

Passenger facilities promised include free Wi-Fi, at-seat wireless inductive charging for electronic devices, 230V sockets and USB sockets; a catering offer and a real-time passenger information system that can advise of connecting rail services.

In June 2022, static testing commenced at Newton Aycliffe and dynamic testing followed in November. Main line testing was scheduled towards the end of 2022, with introduction into service planned in spring 2023.

Fleet details

References

External links

High-speed trains of the United Kingdom
Hitachi multiple units
Hybrid multiple units
25 kV AC multiple units
Train-related introductions in 2023